The zurna (Armenian: զուռնա zuṙna; Old Armenian: սուռնայ suṙnay; Albanian: surle/surla; Persian: karna/Kornay/surnay; Macedonian: зурла/сурла zurla/surla; Bulgarian: зурна/зурла; Serbian: зурла/zurla; Syriac Aramaic: ܙܘܪܢܐ/zurna; Tat: zurna; Turkish: zurna; Kurdish: zirne; Greek: ζουρνας; Azeri: zurna) is a double reed wind instrument played in central Eurasia, Western Asia and parts of North Africa. It is usually accompanied by a davul (bass drum) in Armenian, Anatolian and Assyrian folk music.

Characteristics and history

The zurna, like the duduk and kaval, is a woodwind instrument used to play folk music.

The zurna is made from the slow-growing and hardwood of fruit trees such as plum or apricot (Prunus armeniaca). There are several different types of zurnas. The longest (and lowest-pitched) is the kaba zurna, used in eastern Turkey and Bulgaria, the shortest (and highest-pitched), which can be made of bone, is the zurna played in Messolonghi and other villages of Aetolia-Acarnania region in Greece.

The zurna, a relative of the oboe, is found almost everywhere where the common reed grows because it uses a short cylindrical reed that is tied to a conical brass tube on one end, flattened to a narrow slit on the other end as a source of the sound.

It requires high pressure to give any tone at all and when it does, it is almost constantly loud, high pitched, sharp, and piercing.

The need for high pressure makes it suitable for playing without stop using circular breathing. A small pacifier-style disk that the lips may lean on helps the lip muscles that hold the high-pressure air, rest, and recover during long non-stop playing sessions.

The combination of constant volume and non-stop playing makes the zurna unsuitable for emphasis of the rhythm. It has therefore been played almost invariably along with big drums that both provide the rhythm and the lower frequencies that travel further away than the zurna's loud, high pitched sound.

It has a cylindrical bore, and a bell opening out in a parabolic curve, thus adapted to reflect the sound straight ahead. Because of its loud and highly directional sound as well as accompaniment by big drums, it has historically been played outdoors, during festive events such as weddings and public celebrations. It has also been used to gather crowds in order to make official announcements. This use of the zurna as a token of the ruling power developed into Janissary bands and eventually into military music.

Seven holes on the front, and one thumb hole, provide a range of over one octave including some transposition.

It is similar to the mizmar. Zurnas are used in the folk music of many countries and regions, especially in Armenia, Iran, Algeria, Azerbaijan, Central Asia, Iraq, Syria, Turkey, Greece, Bulgaria, North Macedonia,  The Maghreb, Albania, Serbia, Bosnia, Croatia and the other Caucasian countries, and have now spread throughout India, China, Korea and Eastern Europe. In the Slavic nations of the Balkans it is typically called zurla (зурла).

The zurna is most likely the immediate predecessor of the European shawm, and is related to the Chinese suona still used today in weddings, temple and funeral music. The Japanese charumera, or charamera, traditionally associated with itinerant noodle vendors is a small zurna, its name derived from the Portuguese chirimoya. Few, if any, noodle vendors continue this tradition, and those who do would use a loudspeaker playing a recorded charumera.

A zurna was used by frontman Stu Mackenzie in King Gizzard & the Lizard Wizard's 9th studio album, Flying Microtonal Banana.

Folklore
Turkish lore says that Adam, who was moulded from clay, had no soul. It is said only the melodious tuiduk-playing of Archangel Gabriel could breathe life into Adam. According to a Turkmen legend, the devil played the main role in tuiduk invention (note the term ″devil openings", şeytan delikleri, in Turkish for the small apertures on the bell).

Etymology and terminology 

The term is attested in the oldest Turkic records, as "suruna" in the 12th and 13th century Codex Cumanicus (CCM fol. 45a). Zurna has also been suggested as a possible borrowing from Hittite or Luwian into the Armenian language, where Arm. զուռնա zuṙna is compared to Luwian zurni "horn".

See also
Pku
Zhaleika
Duduk
Ney
Sorna
Rhaita
Suona
Kangling
Sopila
Piffero

Notes

References

External links
Armenian Zurna, Duduk.com
Janitschareninstrumente und Europa. Memo G. Schachiner, MusicalConfrontations.com
 Zurna FAQ by Satilmis Yayla, 1996 Oslo, Norway. Archived at Wayback Machine

Single oboes with conical bore
Early musical instruments
Algerian musical instruments
Arabic musical instruments
Armenian musical instruments
Azerbaijani musical instruments
Croatian musical instruments
Macedonian musical instruments
Turkish folk music instruments
Albanian musical instruments
Serbian musical instruments
Hungarian musical instruments
Bulgarian musical instruments
Uzbekistani musical instruments
Bosnian musical instruments
Dagestanian musical instruments
Tajik musical instruments
Lithuanian musical instruments
Belarusian musical instruments
Turkmen musical instruments
Pakistani musical instruments
Musical instruments of Georgia (country)
Afghan musical instruments
Laz musical instruments
Pontic Greek musical instruments